Cauldron II: The Pumpkin Strikes Back is a video game developed and published by British developer Palace Software as a sequel to their 1985 game Cauldron. The  2D platform game was released in 1986 for the ZX Spectrum, Commodore 64, and Amstrad CPC home computers. Players control a bouncing pumpkin that is on a quest of vengeance against the "Witch Queen".  The roles of the two were reversed from the first game, in which the witch defeated a monstrous pumpkin.

Following the success of Cauldron, Palace employee Steve Brown began work on a sequel. To provide fans of the original title with a new experience, a very different style of gameplay was implemented for the sequel, although several minor features retained connections to the first. Inspired by the bouncing pumpkin character in Cauldron, Brown designed the game around the character's movement. The bouncing mechanic proved problematic for the programmers who were unable to perfect its implementation. Technical limitations also prevented them from implementing certain animations, such as turning pages of a book.

Cauldron II was first released on the Commodore 64. It was released in the following years on other systems and as re-releases. The game received praise, mainly for its audio-visuals, in video game magazines. Difficulty in handling the bouncing pumpkin's movement was a common complaint, although reviewers felt the overall package was of good value.

Gameplay 

In Cauldron, the protagonist was a witch who became the "Witch Queen" by defeating an enemy called the "Pumpking". In its sequel, players control a pumpkin that has survived the witch's ascent to power and seeks to defeat her. Cauldron II takes place in the witch's castle, and players control the pumpkin, moving it through the 2D game world that is shown as side views. Six magical items—a Goblet, Axe, Shield, Crown, Scissors, and Book of Spells—are scattered throughout the castle and when collected by the player character, augment the pumpkin's abilities, providing it with offensive and defensive capabilities. Collecting the items also allows the pumpkin to access the witch's chambers and cut a lock of her hair, which is required to defeat the witch and complete the game.

The protagonist traverses the castle by bouncing, and players control the pumpkin by manipulating the direction and height of its bounce. Similar to the previous game, Halloween-themed enemies, such as ghosts, monsters, and skeletons, inhabit the game world. Contact with an enemy drains the pumpkin's magic meter that also fuels the protagonist's offensive projectiles. The character dies once the meter is depleted. The pumpkin has a limited number of lives to continue the game, which ends once all of the pumpkin's lives have been expended. On continuing, the pumpkin reappears on the screen with a refilled meter.

Development 

The success of Cauldron in 1985 prompted Palace Software to produce a sequel. Rather than recycle the previous game's design, the development team wanted to be innovative and implement new gameplay features. Steven Brown and Richard Leinfellner resumed their roles as designer and programmer, respectively. Richard Joseph handled the audio design and Stan Schembri programmed the Commodore 64 version.

Brown first drew inspiration from the final scene of Cauldron: the witch's fight against the Pumpking, which bounced around a room. He felt the bouncing pumpkin looked "cool" and decided to base the sequel's gameplay on this aspect. Although unsure about the idea, the other team members proceeded with development. Intended to mimic a bouncing ball, the pumpkin's movement could change direction only if force is applied to it while it is in contact with a surface that provides friction. This mechanic prohibited the pumpkin from changing directions while in mid-air, and proved problematic for the programmers to implement. Issues included difficulties with collision detection, unpredictable movements that led to glitches, and troubles with the firing mechanism. The pumpkin's ability to fire projectiles was intended to provide offensive game mechanics to players. In early designs, however, the projectile inadvertently generated a force that changed the pumpkin's direction. The programmers tried to correct this, but were unable to create a perfect solution.

As the gameplay designs were being implemented, Brown switched his focus to the game's aesthetics. Scenes from the game were sketched on storyboards to aid development. Cauldron IIs game world, the witch's castle, was designed to resemble Palace Software's logo as an advertising tactic. Brown photographed separate screens of the game and assembled them into a complete map, showing the shape of his company's logo, for video game magazines. Enemy designs were similar to those in the previous game, based on the Halloween holiday. Brown envisioned a graphical effect for the game's narration, showing a book whose pages turned as the story is read. However, technical limitations at the time prohibited the implementation of such a visual effect. Brown also wanted the game's visuals to scroll seamlessly as the character moved through the game world, but flick-screening (showing one section of the world at a time) was more feasible. As with the previous game, Brown created a Plasticine model of the witch character as a reference for a painting that was used for the game's box art. The group tested the game prior to release and deemed it too challenging. They reduced the difficulty level so that more players could complete the game.

Palace Software developed Cauldron II for three home computers: Amstrad CPC, Commodore 64, and ZX Spectrum. The game was first released for the Commodore 64, and then for the Amstrad CPC and ZX Spectrum. It was later re-released on the ZX Spectrum in 1989 by Telecomsoft under its Silverbird budget label. Cauldron II was also re-released with the first game as a compilation title for Amstrad CPC and ZX Spectrum computers.

Reception 

The game was well-received by video game journalists upon its release. ZX Spectrum magazines Crash and ZX Computing awarded Cauldron II their top accolades: "Crash Smash" and "Monster Hit", respectively. Similar to the first Cauldron, praise from the video game press focused on the graphical quality, and criticism directed at the gameplay was mixed. Computer and Video Games reviewer Paul Boughton praised the size of the game world, but criticized the audio quality of the Amstrad CPC and ZX Spectrum versions, citing the limited capabilities of the two systems. In concluding his review, Boughton felt any version of the game would be worth purchasing. Phil South of Your Sinclair praised the game's presentation and design, calling the graphics "lovely" and the platform gameplay "original". ZX Computing reviewer praised the audio-visuals, and recommended the title for fans of the previous game. A Crash magazine reviewer lauded the audio-visuals of the ZX Spectrum version and commented that the gameplay offered more than its predecessor's. The reviewer described Cauldron II as difficult, but felt that the sense of accomplishment gained from successful completion outweighed the negative aspect. Computer Gamers reviewer criticized the bouncing gameplay, citing unpredictable reactions and difficulty in navigating around tough enemies. Rich Pelley and Jon Pillar of Your Sinclair echoed similar comments. Retro Gamer writer Craig Grannell described the game's difficulty as the "only real criticism". The ZX Computing reviewer also criticized the bouncing aspect, but praised the overall game design as enjoyable. Phil King, another Crash reviewer, praised the Silverbird re-release. He called the graphics "colorful" and "well-animated", and felt that the game was of good value despite its excessive difficulty.

Legacy
The commercial success of the two Cauldron games prompted Palace to give Brown more creative freedom for his following project, Barbarian: The Ultimate Warrior.

References 

1986 video games
Amstrad CPC games
Commodore 64 games
Europe-exclusive video games
Halloween video games
Video game sequels
Video games scored by Richard Joseph
Video games developed in the United Kingdom
Video games about witchcraft
Video games set in castles
ZX Spectrum games
Single-player video games
Action-adventure games
Platform games
Palace Software games